Sawyerwood is a census-designated place in Summit County, in the U.S. state of Ohio.

Demographics

As of the census of 2010, there were 1,540 people living in the CDP.

History
A post office called Sawyerwood was established in 1916, and remained in operation until 1958. The planned community was named after William T. Sawyer, who designed it.

References

Unincorporated communities in Summit County, Ohio
Unincorporated communities in Ohio